Rockbrook Park School is a fee-paying, secondary school for boys, located on Edmondstown Road, Rathfarnham, Dublin 16, Ireland. It was established by a group of parents, partly inspired by the work of the founder of Opus Dei.

History

The school was founded in 1971, first as a "pre-university centre" at 144-116 St Stephen's Green, offering repeat Leaving Cert classes for students. In 1972, classes were expanded. Later, in 1975, the school moved to Rockbrook House and surrounding forty acres buying them from John Brown, who was retiring as chief brewer with Guinness and moving back to England. The price paid was £75,000 Irish pounds. In the summer of 1980, five classrooms and a number of small mentoring rooms were added at a cost of £44,000  Irish pounds.

In 2006-2008, Rockbrook took on the biggest step in its history, building a brand new school building, car park, sports pavilion, and two new soccer pitches costing €5 million.

School ethos

Rockbrook's education is grounded on a "Christian understanding of the world and of the human person". The school "welcomes and respects students of other beliefs and accommodates these insofar as is practical". The school states that it "fosters a respect for others, regardless of talents, race, colour, creed or social standing".

The founding parents were reportedly inspired by St. Josemaría Escrivá, the founder of Opus Dei, a personal prelature of the Catholic Church. St Josemaria’s teaching about the value of "one's ordinary work as a stepping stone to God impacts on the school’s approach to encouraging hard work, excellence and a spirit of service within the school community".

Sports
Rockbrook' first sports are soccer and orienteering, and it has had a number of championship successes in both sports. It has Ireland's first padel tennis court.

References

External links
Official website

Boys' schools in the Republic of Ireland
Secondary schools in County Dublin
Rathfarnham
Educational institutions established in 1971
1971 establishments in Ireland
Private schools in the Republic of Ireland
Roman Catholic schools in the Republic of Ireland